Kandyty  is a village in the administrative district of Gmina Górowo Iławeckie, within Bartoszyce County, Warmian-Masurian Voivodeship, in northern Poland, close to the border with the Kaliningrad Oblast of Russia.

History 

In 1285 the ownership of an area named "Catithen" in the Old Prussian area of Natangia was awarded to the Sudovian nobleman Skomand by the Teutonic Order. The name probably derives back to the Old Prussian term for a small ford. About 1350, throughout the German Settlement in the East, a village "Canditten", sized 80 "Hufen", a square measure of the Teutonic Knights, and a church was founded by the Order. Throughout the Polish-teutonic Hunger War of 1414 the village and the Church was destroyed by Polish troops, the Priest and 7 farmers were killed. An estimated damage of 3,500 Mark in the village and 1,000 Mark at the Church was calculated by the Teutonic Knights. The village suffered again throughout the Polish-Teutonic  Thirteen Years' War of 1454/66 and was given as a pawn to the nobleman Paul Pregel in 1491. The Church was completely destroyed in the horsemen's War of 1521, only 4 farmers lived here in 1540. In 1575 the landlord Truchseß von Waldburg re-established the Church. In 1664 the von Schwerin family of Wildenhoff became the landlords, which lasted until the abolition of serfdom in Prussia. 

In 1820 2 manors, 21 farms, 4 cottages and 6 craftsmen existed. 
 
Until 1945 the area was part of the German Province of East Prussia, Kanditten was occupied by the Soviet Red Army on 18 February 1945 throughout the East Prussian Offensive. After World War II the area became part of Poland under the terms of the Potsdam Agreement.

Population 
1820: 256
1846: 540
1871: 765
1895: 772
1933: 803
1939: 930
2008: 980

References

Kandyty